Yuraq Punta (Quechua yuraq white, punta peak; ridge, "white peak (or ridge)", also spelled Yurajpunta) is a mountain in the Wansu mountain range in the Andes of Peru, about  high. It is located in the Arequipa Region, La Unión Province, Puyca District. Yuraq Punta lies west of Minata, northeast of Chawpi Chawpi and Chunta, and east of Tintaya, north of a lake named Ikmaqucha (Quechua for "widow lake").

References 

Mountains of Peru
Mountains of Arequipa Region